Rethwisch or Rehtwisch may refer to:

Places 
 Rethwisch, Stormarn, a municipality in the Stormarn district, Schleswig-Holstein
 Rethwisch, Steinburg, a municipality in Steinburg district, Schleswig-Holstein
 Rethwisch, a village in the municipality of Börgerende-Rethwisch in Rostock district, Mecklenburg-Western Pomerania
 Rethwisch, a village in the municipality of Lehmkuhlen in Plön district, Schleswig-Holstein
 Rethwisch, part of the municipality of Möllenhagen in Mecklenburgische Seenplatte district, Mecklenburg-Western Pomerania
 Rethwisch, part of the municipality of Schönwalde am Bungsberg, Schleswig-Holstein

People 

  (1845–1921), German teacher and historian
 Ernst Rethwisch (actor) (1824–1879), German actor 
 Ernst Rethwisch (journalist) (1852–1913), German journalist and author
  (born 1938), German businessman and benefactor
 Karl Rethwisch (1839–1909), German recitor and Low German poet
  (Karl Anton Theodor Rethwisch; 1824–1904), German tax official and regional poet
  (1864–1912), German author